Caltabellotta (Sicilian: Cataviḍḍotta) is a comune (municipality) in the Province of Agrigento in the Italian region Sicily, located about  south of Palermo and about  northwest of Agrigento.

History
Caltabellotta has been identified with the ancient town of the Sicani Triocala, captured by the Romans in 99 BC. After the fall of the Western Roman Empire and several centuries under the Byzantine Empire, it was stormed by the Arabs, who later built here a castle. In 1090 it was conquered by the Normans of Roger of Sicily.

The diocese of Triocala, called in Latin Trecalae in the Catholic Church's list of titular sees, is mentioned in the 6th-century Synecdemus as Τρόκαλις (Trocalis).

Its reputed first bishop was Saint Pellegrino, a disciple of Saint Peter. Historical documents give the names of four bishops of the see:
Peter, mentioned in two letters of Pope Gregory I in about 598;
Maximus, who took part in the Lateran Council of 649 called by Pope Martin I;
Gregory, who signed the acts of the Third Council of Constantinople in 680;
John, who participated in the Second Council of Nicaea

The town was the location of the Peace of Caltabellotta (1302) which ended the War of the Sicilian Vespers.

People 
Pedro de Luna - Peralta y Medici-Salviati

References

Sources
 Trigilia, Melchiorre (2011). S. Pellegrino di Caltabellotta. Caltabellotta.

External links 

Official website
Local portal

Cities and towns in Sicily